Henry Huskinson (19 January 1890 – 4 July 1963) was a British gymnast. He competed in the men's team all-around event at the 1908 Summer Olympics.

References

External links
 

1890 births
1963 deaths
British male artistic gymnasts
Olympic gymnasts of Great Britain
Gymnasts at the 1908 Summer Olympics
Sportspeople from Birmingham, West Midlands
20th-century British people